The 5th constituency of the Haute-Savoie (French: Cinquième circonscription de la Haute-Savoie) is a French legislative constituency in the Haute-Savoie département. Like the other 576 French constituencies, it elects one MP using a two round electoral system.

Description

The 5th constituency of Haute-Savoie covers the north east of the department including Thonon-les-Bains on the banks of Lake Geneva.

The seat has historically supported centre right candidates, however in 2017 the seat along with three others in the department fell to Emmanuel Macron's En Marche! party with the LR coming third in the first round.

Assembly members

Election results

2022

 
 
 
|-
| colspan="8" bgcolor="#E9E9E9"|
|-
 

 
 
 
 
 * Ducrot ran as a dissident member of LR, who supported Dion's candidacy.

2017

 
 
 
 
 
 
 
 
|-
| colspan="8" bgcolor="#E9E9E9"|
|-

2012

 
 
 
 
 
 
 
|-
| colspan="8" bgcolor="#E9E9E9"|
|-

References

5